Eeva Elisabeth Joenpelto (17 June 1921, Sammatti, Finland – 28 January 2004, Lohja, Finland), married name after 1945 Hellemann, was an award-winning Finnish novelist. Her writing is especially remembered for the Lohja tetralogy which depicted strong women. Described as a "productive novelist of monomaniacal intensity", she occasionally wrote under the pseudonyms of Eeva Helle and Eeva Autere. Joenpelto was President of PEN Finland in 1964-67 and worked as an art professor from 1980–85. She was married (until 1975) to Jarl Hellemann, the CEO of Tammi.

Eeva Joenpelto Prize
The Eeva Joenpelto Prize in literature has been awarded by Lohja to honor the city's written heritage. Its recipients have been:
 1988 – Jaan Kross
 1992 – Olof Lagercrantz
 1995 – Sándor Csoóri
 1998 – Andreï Makine
 2001 – Bernhard Schlink
 2004 – Herbjørg Wassmo

Selected works
{{columns-list|colwidth=22em|
Seitsemän päivää, under the pseudonym Eeva Helle 1946
Tulee sittenkin päivä..., under the pseudonym Eeva Autere 1950
Kaakerholman kaupunki, 1950
Veljen varjo, 1951
Johannes vain, 1952
Kivi palaa, 1953
Neito kulkee vetten päällä, 1955
Missä lintuset laulaa, 1957
Ralli, 1959
Syyskesä, 1960
Kipinöivät vuodet, 1961
Naisten kesken, 1962
Viisaat istuvat varjossa, 1964
Ritari metsien pimennosta, 1966
Halusit tai et, 1969
Vesissä toinen silmä, [1971
Vetää kaikista ovista, 1974 (Lohja series, Part 1)
Kuin kekäle kädessä, 1976 (Lohja series, Part 2)
Sataa suolaista vettä, 1978 Lohja series, Part 3)
Eteisiin ja kynnyksille, 1980 (Lohja series, Part 4)
Elämän rouva, rouva Glad, 1982
Rikas ja kunniallinen, 1984Jottei varjos haalistu, 1986Ei ryppyä, ei tahraa, 1989Avoin, hellä ja katumaton, 1991Tuomari Müller, hieno mies, 1994Uskomattomia uhrauksia, 2000
}}

Awards
 Thanks for the Book Award for Vetää kaikista ovista  (1975)
 Finlandia Prize for Tuomari Müller, hieno mies (1994)

 References 

Further reading
 Mahlamäki, Tiina: Kuinka elää ihmisiksi? Eeva Joenpellon kirjailijamuotokuva. Suomalaisen Kirjallisuuden Seura, 2009. .
 Mahlamäki, Tiina: Naisia kansalaisuuden kynnyksellä. Eeva Joenpellon Lohja-sarjan tulkinta''. Suomalaisen Kirjallisuuden Seura, 2005.

External links
 
 Eeva Joenpelto at Historical Dictionary of Scandinavian Literature and Theater

1921 births
2004 deaths
People from Lohja
Finnish women novelists
Writers from Uusimaa
20th-century Finnish women writers
20th-century Finnish novelists
Pro Finlandia Medals of the Order of the Lion of Finland
Finlandia Prize winners